The 1974-75 NBA season was the Bulls' ninth season in the NBA. The season saw the Bulls clinch the Midwest Division championship, their first title of any kind, and the only one prior to the dynasty years of the 1990s.

Offseason

Draft picks

Roster

Regular season

Season standings

z – clinched division title
y – clinched division title
x – clinched playoff spot

Record vs. opponents

Playoffs

|- align="center" bgcolor="#ccffcc"
| 1
| April 9
| Kansas City–Omaha
| W 95–89
| Bob Love (38)
| Tom Boerwinkle (12)
| Tom Boerwinkle (5)
| Chicago Stadium15,433
| 1–0
|- align="center" bgcolor="#ffcccc"
| 2
| April 13
| @ Kansas City–Omaha
| L 95–102
| Chet Walker (20)
| Tom Boerwinkle (12)
| Tom Boerwinkle (3)
| Kemper Arena11,378
| 1–1
|- align="center" bgcolor="#ccffcc"
| 3
| April 16
| Kansas City–Omaha
| W 93–90
| Bob Love (31)
| Tom Boerwinkle (24)
| Norm Van Lier (6)
| Chicago Stadium18,347
| 2–1
|- align="center" bgcolor="#ffcccc"
| 4
| April 18
| @ Kansas City–Omaha
| L 100–104 (OT)
| Bob Love (34)
| Tom Boerwinkle (17)
| Tom Boerwinkle (5)
| Kemper Arena14,945
| 2–2
|- align="center" bgcolor="#ccffcc"
| 5
| April 20
| Kansas City–Omaha
| W 104–77
| Bob Love (30)
| Tom Boerwinkle (19)
| Tom Boerwinkle (8)
| Chicago Stadium16,247
| 3–2
|- align="center" bgcolor="#ccffcc"
| 6
| April 23
| @ Kansas City–Omaha
| W 101–89
| Bob Love (26)
| Tom Boerwinkle (14)
| Norm Van Lier (4)
| Kemper Arena12,445
| 4–2
|-

|- align="center" bgcolor="#ffcccc"
| 1
| April 27
| @ Golden State
| L 89–107
| Bob Love (37)
| Nate Thurmond (7)
| Tom Boerwinkle (4)
| Oakland–Alameda County Coliseum Arena12,787
| 0–1
|- align="center" bgcolor="#ccffcc"
| 2
| April 30
| Golden State
| W 90–89
| Chet Walker (28)
| Tom Boerwinkle (14)
| Tom Boerwinkle (5)
| Chicago Stadium18,533
| 1–1
|- align="center" bgcolor="#ccffcc"
| 3
| May 4
| Golden State
| W 108–101
| Norm Van Lier (35)
| Nate Thurmond (12)
| Norm Van Lier (9)
| Chicago Stadium19,128
| 2–1
|- align="center" bgcolor="#ffcccc"
| 4
| May 6
| @ Golden State
| L 106–111
| Bob Love (27)
| Jerry Sloan (12)
| Norm Van Lier (9)
| Oakland–Alameda County Coliseum Arena12,787
| 2–2
|- align="center" bgcolor="#ccffcc"
| 5
| May 8
| @ Golden State
| W 89–79
| Chet Walker (21)
| Sloan, Boerwinkle (10)
| Van Lier, Boerwinkle (4)
| Oakland–Alameda County Coliseum Arena12,787
| 3–2
|- align="center" bgcolor="#ffcccc"
| 6
| May 11
| Golden State
| L 72–86
| Norm Van Lier (24)
| Sloan, Boerwinkle (8)
| Nate Thurmond (5)
| Chicago Stadium19,594
| 3–3
|- align="center" bgcolor="#ffcccc"
| 7
| May 14
| @ Golden State
| L 79–83
| Chet Walker (21)
| Tom Boerwinkle (16)
| Tom Boerwinkle (6)
| Oakland–Alameda County Coliseum Arena
| 3–4
|-

Awards and records
Jerry Sloan, NBA All-Defensive First Team
Norm Van Lier, NBA All-Defensive Second Team
Bob Love, NBA All-Defensive Second Team

References

Chicago
Chicago Bulls seasons
Chicago Bulls
Chicago Bulls